Esmé Stuart or Stewart may refer to:

Esmé Stewart, 1st Duke of Lennox (1542–1583), son of John Stewart, 5th Lord of Aubigny
Esmé Stuart, 2nd Duke of Lennox, Scottish nobleman
Esmé Stewart, 3rd Duke of Lennox (1579–1624), son of Esmé Stewart, 1st Duke of Lennox
Esmé Stuart, 2nd Duke of Richmond (1649–1660), also 5th Duke of Lennox

See also 
 Esmè Stuart, writer